Maddenstown is a village in County Kildare, Ireland, south of The Curragh and east of Kildare town. It is situated in the barony of Offaly West and the parish of Ballysax.

Maddenstown is close to the Curragh race course and is a base for stud farms such as Michael Keogh’s Ballysax Manor Stud and racehorse trainers Ms F M Crowley, Paul Deegan, JT Gorman, Caroline Hutchinson, Peter Henley and William Mark Roper. It is located close to the village of Cutbush, and had a population of 133 as of the 2016 census.

History
Maddenstown House was home to Captain William Kelly, horse racing enthusiast and patron of prize fighter Dan Donnelly. Ballyfair House was home to the Lord Lieutenant of Ireland when races were staged at the Curragh Racecourse. James Touchet, third earl of Castlehaven's house at Maddenstown served as a refuge for "a great number of English protestants that had been robbed by the rebels’ and then helped them find their way to safety".

Sport
Suncroft GAA is the local Gaelic Athletic Association club.

See also
List of towns and villages in Ireland

References

Towns and villages in County Kildare